The Firth of Clyde  is the mouth of the River Clyde. It is located on the west coast of Scotland and constitutes the deepest coastal waters in the British Isles (it is 164 metres deep at its deepest). The firth is sheltered from the Atlantic Ocean by the Kintyre peninsula, which encloses the outer firth in Argyll and Ayrshire. The Kilbrannan Sound is a large arm of the Firth of Clyde, separating the Kintyre Peninsula from the Isle of Arran. Within the Firth of Clyde is another major island – the Isle of Bute.  Given its strategic location at the entrance to the middle and upper Clyde, Bute played a vital naval military role during World War II.

Geography
At one area in its upper reaches, it is joined by Loch Long and the Gare Loch. This area includes the large anchorage off of Greenock that is known as the Tail of the Bank. (The “Bank” is a reference to the sandbank and shoal that separates the firth from the estuary of the River Clyde.) Its upper tidal limit is at the tidal weir adjacent to Glasgow Green.

The geographical (and popular) distinction between the firth and the River Clyde is vague. Some refer to Dumbarton as being “on the Firth of Clyde”. At the same time, the residents of Port Glasgow and Greenock often refer to the part of the firth that lies to the north of those areas as "the river".

The Firth encompasses many islands and peninsulas, and 12 ferry routes connect them to the mainland and to each other. The Firth is sometimes called the Clyde Waters, and is customarily considered to be part of the Irish Sea.  The ferry services are run by Caledonian MacBrayne and by Western Ferries, and many of the routes are lifeline services for communities living in remote areas. A large number of sea lochs adjoin the Firth—-the largest being Loch Fyne.

Cowal Peninsula

The Cowal peninsula extends into the Firth of Clyde and forms the main western shoreline of the upper firth. The main town on the Cowal peninsula is Dunoon.

Ferries
Traveling along routes across the Firth of Clyde saves time compared to traveling "round by road", via the Loch Eck side (A815 road), the Rest and Be Thankful (A83 road), and Loch Lomond side (A82 road).

The service between Dunoon and Gourock in Inverclyde is operated by Caledonian MacBrayne. (Between 2011 and 2019 it was operated by that company's subsidiary, Argyll Ferries). The service, which carries only foot passengers, connects directly with the ScotRail service to Glasgow.

Western Ferries operate the service between Hunters Quay and McInroy's Point near Gourock and carry all types of vehicular transport as well as foot passengers.

Towns and villages along the shoreline

Here is a list of the major towns and some of the numerous villages along the firth (but not along the River Clyde or the connecting lochs):

Islands in the Clyde

There are many islands in the firth. The largest ones all have thriving communities and regular ferry services connecting them to the mainland. They are:

Arran
Bute
Cumbrae

Sea lochs off the Clyde

History
The Clyde has been an important sea route from the earliest times. For example, the Battle of Largs, which was fought there in 1263, was a geopolitical turning point: It marked the end of Norse ambitions in Britain. Beginning in the 16th century, the Clyde increasingly became a conduit for commercial and industrial products, including: herring; timber; wine; sugar; tobacco; textiles; iron and steel; coal; oil; industrial chemicals; distillation and brewing; ships, locomotives, and other vehicles; and other manufactured products.

In the middle of the 19th century, the sport of yachting became popular on the Clyde.  The area became famous worldwide for its significant contribution to yachting and yachtbuilding with notable designers including: William Fife III; Alfred Mylne; G L Watson; David Boyd. It was also the location of many famous yacht yards. Clyde-built wooden yachts are still known for quality and style today.

With the advent of tourism in Victorian times, the area became popular with Glaswegians and residents of neighbouring towns and counties who travelled "doon the watter" on Clyde steamers to holiday in the picturesque seaside towns and villages that line the firth, with the more wealthy building substantial holiday homes along its coasts. Many towns, such as Gourock, Largs, Ayr, Dunoon, Rothesay, flourished during this period and became fully fledged resorts with well-appointed hotels and attractions. Golf courses, including major championship courses, proliferated.

The "lower Clyde" shipyards of Greenock and Port Glasgow, most notably Scott Lithgow, played an important historical role in shipbuilding. The  was the first successful steamboat in Europe, and, until well into the 20th century, a large proportion of the world's ships were built there.

During World War II, Glasgow and the Clyde became the main entry point in Britain for the Allied forces’ merchant shipping, military personnel, and equipment, and for the assembly, despatch, and control of their ocean convoys. The Clyde also hosted the country's largest naval base. In 1942, a submarine oil pipeline that had been laid across the Firth of Clyde was the site of Operation Pluto, the world's first deep-water test of its kind. This was one of many innovations designed to support air, maritime, and territorial combat during World War II.

Today, tourism, sport and recreation, and heritage history continue to attract visitors from across the world. The steam-powered —in addition to its regular service—still makes cruising trips to the coastal towns that have been popular tourist destinations since the 19th century. The Firth is ringed by many castles and buildings of historical importance that are open to the public, including Inveraray Castle, Brodick Castle, the opulent Mount Stuart House on the Isle of Bute, and Culzean Castle, which is the most visited attraction owned by the National Trust for Scotland. Ocean liners frequently call at Greenock, and Glasgow International Airport and Glasgow Prestwick Airport are nearby. There is frequent rail service to and from the coast, including links to Oban and Fort William, with city terminals in Glasgow and Edinburgh. There is also daily ferry service between the area and Belfast.

In recent times, the natural environment of the firth has been compromised in places by a succession of industrial and military developments along the shoreline, including the Hunterston B nuclear power station and Hunterston deepwater terminal. At the same time, shipbuilding has declined. In the upper Clyde, at Glasgow Govan and Scotstoun, two major shipyards are still in operation. They are run by BAE, whose major client is the Royal Navy. In the lower Clyde, only one shipyard still operates: Ferguson Shipbuilders, which is next to Newark Castle, Port Glasgow. The Garvel dry dock in Greenock continues in operation for ship repair, and the large Inchgreen dry dock in Greenock is in occasional use. The sites of former shipyards are being redeveloped into areas that contain residential housing, leisure facilities, and commercial buildings.

Nature and conservation

On Great Cumbrae, there is a marine biological station, run jointly by the University of Glasgow and the University of London.

Common and grey seals abound in the firth. Harbour porpoises are also common. While dolphins are much less common, some were spotted in the upper reaches of the firth in the summer of 2005.

Also, in 2005, the firth had the second-highest number of basking shark sightings in Scotland (after the Minch).  These huge sharks seem to particularly favour the warm, shallow waters surrounding Pladda.

However, although commercial fishing was at one time intensive in the Firth's many fishing towns, today the only catches of commercial interest remaining in the Clyde waters are prawns, lobsters, herring, mussels, and crayfish.

In September 2008, Scotland's first No Take Zone (NTZ) was introduced in Lamlash Bay, on the Isle of Arran. This was the result of a community effort, led by the Community of Arran Seabed Trust (C.O.A.S.T).  The NTZ was introduced specifically to protect delicate marine communities such as maerl. Maerl is a very slow-growing coral-like calcareous red algae (it grows only 1 mm per year). It is an important Scottish species. Maerl beds are reservoirs of biodiversity and are crucial nursery grounds for young scallops and young fish. Studies have shown that both scallop dredging and organic waste from fish farms significantly reduce the live maerl population. Scallop dredging on a maerl bed has been found to kill over 70% of live maerl. Monitoring the bed over the next four years found no discernible recovery, suggesting that maerl beds would require many years free of disturbance in order to recover.

In 2014,  of sea at the mouth of firth between Kintyre and the Rhins of Galloway was declared a Nature Conservation Marine Protected Area, designated Clyde Sill MPA(NC). The MPA covers a distinctive sill at the mouth of the firth, where the warmer, fresher water of the Clyde mixes with the cooler, more saline water of the North Channel. This is a rich environment for plankton, which provide food for fish that are in turn eaten by higher marine predators and seabirds.

Shipping in the Firth

The Firth of Clyde, like the River Clyde, has historically been an important centre of shipbuilding and shipping. Upriver, there have been shipbuilding and engineering centres at Glasgow, Govan, Clydebank, Dumbarton, and Renfrew. Downriver, there have been major yards at Greenock and Port Glasgow; smaller yards at Irvine, Ardrossan, Troon, and Campbeltown; and various other boatyards, including those at Hunters Quay, Port Bannatyne, and Fairlie. Today, the Ferguson Marine shipbuilding yard, adjacent to Newark Castle, Port Glasgow, is the last merchant shipbuilder on the Clyde, and it is owned by the Scottish Government. In Greenock, the large dry dock and ship-repair facilities at Inchgreen opened in 1964, and were subsequently taken over by Scott Lithgow. The dry dock there is 305 m long and 44 m wide. With the demise of Scott Lithgow, the facilities came under the management of Clydeport, which, along with Cammell Laird, is now part of Peel Ports Group.

The Firth of Clyde has one of the deepest sea-entrance channels in Northern Europe. It can accommodate the largest Capesize vessels afloat today. As a result, the Clyde was one of the UK's leading ports, handling some 7.5 million tonnes of cargo each year. Hunterston Terminal was constructed to bring in bulk ore, but later mainly dealt with coal imports, and closed in 2016. Supertankers up to 324,000 tonnes travel up the firth to deliver crude oil to Finnart Oil Terminal in Loch Long, which is connected by pipeline to the Grangemouth Refinery on the Firth of Forth. A second pipeline brings back refined oil products for export (in smaller oil tankers) mainly to Northern Ireland.

Greenock's Ocean Terminal facility handles cargo from container ships. It has also become a busy cruise liner port, with a new floating pontoon berth.

The Royal Navy has a significant—-and controversial—-presence on the Clyde, both at HMNB Clyde on the Gare Loch, and on Loch Long, connected to the nuclear storage facilities in Coulport and at Glen Douglas. The dockyard engineering and operations are managed by Babcock International. One of the three main ports that provide marine-services support vessels is located at Greenock, and was previously operated directly by the Royal Maritime Auxiliary Service.

Lighthouses and navigation beacons

There are lighthouses at:

Cloch Point on the Inverclyde coast.
Toward Point Lighthouse on the Southern tip of the Cowal Peninsula.
Little Cumbrae
Pladda

There are navigation beacons at:
The Gantocks Rocks and Navigation Beacon, off the coast at Dunoon, Cowal Peninsula.

Climate

The Firth's maritime climate is considerably milder than contintental locations at the same latitide. Whilst the reason for this mild climate is the subject of debate it is historically considered to be due to the moderating influence of the North Atlantic Drift, a warm oceanic current that is the eastern extension of the Gulf Stream  which originates in the tropical waters of the Gulf of Mexico.

See also

 Islands of the Clyde

References

Sources
 The Clyde: River and Firth, 1907 and reissued 2010, Neil Munro, with illustrations by Mary Y and Y Young Hunter
 The Firth of Clyde, 1952, George Blake
 Glasgow and the Clyde, 1965, Ward Lock Guide
 Clyde Coast Connections, 2010, Neil Grieves
 From Comet to Cal Mac : Two Centuries of Hebridean and Clyde Shipping, 2011, Donald E Meek and Bruce Peter
 Firth of Clyde: Sailing Directions and Anchorages, 2012, Clyde Cruising Club 
 HM Naval Base: Clyde, 2012, Keith Hall

External links

 
Cowal
Clyde
Islands of the Clyde
Landforms of Argyll and Bute
Nature Conservation Marine Protected Areas of Scotland